Phil Spitalny (November 7, 1890 – October 11, 1970) was a Russian Empire-born American musician, music critic, composer, and bandleader heard often on radio during the 1930s and 1940s. He rose to fame after he led an all-female orchestra, a novelty at the time.

Early years
Spitalny was born into a Jewish family of musicians in Tetiiv, Russian Empire and later was a student at the Odessa Conservatory of Music. A child prodigy on clarinet, he toured Russia and came to the United States in 1905 or 1906.

Orchestra
After playing with bands in Cleveland, Spitalny moved to Boston to direct the orchestra at a theater. Later, he returned to Cleveland, where he led his own orchestra, then went to New York to lead the orchestra at the Pennsylvania Hotel. For two years, he conducted the orchestra at the Stanley Theatre in Pittsburgh, Pennsylvania.

He led orchestras under the name Phil Spitalny and His All-Girl Orchestra, beginning with Hour of Charm Orchestra on his radio program The Hour of Charm in 1934. Spitalny and Evelyn Kaye Klein auditioned over one thousand women to fill the twenty-two piece orchestra. Klein was the featured performer, a virtuoso violinist introduced as Evelyn and her Magic Violin. The program lasted for over ten years on radio. He and Klein married in 1946.

The orchestra made a guest appearance in the Abbott and Costello movie Here Come the Co-Eds in 1945. Spitalny also appeared in When Johnny Comes Marching Home (1942) and on Ed Sullivan's television program Toast of the Town.

Composing
Spitalny wrote music with Gus Kahn, jazz musician Lee “Stubby” Gordon His compositions include “Enchanted Forest”, “It's You, No One But You”, “Madelaine”, “Pining for You”, “Save the Last Dance for Me”, and “The Kiss I Can't Forget”.

Last years and death
In retirement in Miami Beach, Spitalny was a music critic for a Miami newspaper. He died of cancer in Miami Beach in 1970 at the age of 79.

Legacy
Spitalny has a Star on the Hollywood Walk of Fame.

See also
List of old-time American radio people

References

External links

 Phil Spitalny recordings at the Discography of American Historical Recordings.

1890 births
1970 deaths
American jazz violinists
Big band bandleaders
20th-century American violinists
Emigrants from the Russian Empire to the United States
American male composers
American music critics
American male jazz musicians
20th-century American male musicians